The women's 30 kilometre freestyle cross-country skiing competition at the 1992 Winter Olympics in Albertville, France, was held on Friday 21 February at Les Saisies.

Results
The results:

References

External links
Results International Ski Federation

Women's cross-country skiing at the 1992 Winter Olympics
Women's 30 kilometre cross-country skiing at the Winter Olympics